Chloe x Halle are an R&B duo composed of sisters Chloe and Halle Bailey. At a young age, the sisters performed in minor acting roles before moving from Mableton, Georgia to Los Angeles in 2012. The two began posting music covers to YouTube and were acknowledged by Beyoncé, who became their mentor and later signed them to her label, Parkwood Entertainment. They subsequently released the EP Sugar Symphony (2016) and the mixtape The Two of Us (2017).

The duo gained further prominence after starring in the sitcom Grown-ish (2018–2022) and releasing their debut album The Kids Are Alright (2018), for which they earned two Grammy Award nominations including Best New Artist and Best Urban Contemporary Album. In 2020, they released their second studio album Ungodly Hour to critical acclaim, earning them another three Grammy Award nominations including Best Progressive R&B Album, Best R&B Song for "Do It" and Best Traditional R&B Performance for "Wonder What She Thinks of Me". The album's lead single "Do It" became the duo's first song to chart on the  Billboard Hot 100 and the Hot R&B/Hip-Hop Songs, peaking at number 63 and number 23 respectively. The album itself peaked at number 16 and number 11 on the Billboard 200 and Top R&B/Hip-Hop Albums charts, respectively, becoming the duo's highest peak on the former chart and their first on the latter.

Life and career

1998–2015: Early life and career beginnings 
Chloe Elizabeth Bailey and Halle Lynn Bailey were born in Atlanta on July 1, 1998, and March 27, 2000 respectively. They grew up in Mableton, Georgia with their parents Courtney and Doug Bailey, The family moved to Los Angeles in mid 2012. While they were in Georgia, the two played minor acting roles in films, including The Fighting Temptations (2003), starring Beyoncé, where Chloe starred solo, and the Disney Channel original movie Let It Shine (2012). Their dad began teaching them how to write songs at the ages of ten and eight. They launched a YouTube channel at the ages of 13 and 11, respectively, with a cover of Beyoncé's "Best Thing I Never Had". They first performed as Chloe x Halle when uploading covers of pop songs onto this channel. The duo made their talk show debut when they appeared on The Ellen Show in April 2012. They were the winners of the fifth season of The Next Big Thing on Radio Disney in December 2012, and they made a cameo appearance in the Disney series Austin & Ally performing the song "Unstoppable" in September 2013.

After gaining prominence with their YouTube videos and Disney projects, the duo independently released a four-track project titled Uncovered in September 2013. The release was made up of covers of the pop songs "Applause", "We Can't Stop" "Roar" and "Wrecking Ball". Their December 2013 rendition of "Pretty Hurts" by Beyoncé went viral and drew the attention of the singer herself. In 2015, she signed the sister duo to her management company, Parkwood Entertainment, with a reported $1 million deal for six albums. The duo made a cameo appearance in her visual album Beyoncé: Lemonade (2016) and accepted the BET Award for Viewer's Choice on her behalf in 2016.

2016–2017: Sugar Symphony and The Two of Us 
Chloe x Halle made their professional debut with the EP, Sugar Symphony, which was released under Parkwood on April 29, 2016. The duo's debut single and the EP's lead single "Drop" were released in early April. They were accompanied by the EP's second and final single, "Fall," in September 2016. The duo performed the song, in addition to "Baby Bird" and "This is For My Girls," at the White House Easter Egg Roll, where they were introduced by Michelle Obama. Prior to this, Chloe x Halle also had performed as the opening act to Obama's keynote discussion at the SXSW Music Festival in March 2016. They also performed "Drop" at the BET Awards 2016. Chloe x Halle later served as Beyoncé's opening act for the European leg of The Formation World Tour. The duo also supported American singer Andra Day on her Cheers to the Fall tour in late 2016.

In the spring of 2017, Chloe x Halle released their critically acclaimed mixtape, The Two of Us, which featured new music mostly written and produced by the duo. The mixtape was featured on Rolling Stone magazine's Best R&B Albums of 2017 list. In April 2017, the duo performed the U.S. National Anthem to begin the 2017 NFL Draft. Chloe x Halle released the theme song for the TV series Grown-ish, entitled "Grown", in December 2017. After initially signing onto the series for recurring roles, they were upgraded to series regulars for the show's second season. Their song "The Kids Are Alright" was featured in the series debut. They were onn the show for four seasons until their characters graduated.

2018–2019: The Kids Are Alright 

Both "Grown" and "The Kids Are Alright" served as the lead and second singles respectively of Chloe x Halle's debut studio album, The Kids Are Alright, which they announced in late February 2018. Their single "Warrior" appeared on both the soundtrack for the film A Wrinkle in Time (2018) and their debut album. The duo performed the song "America the Beautiful" at Wrestlemania XXXIV in early April 2018. Chloe x Halle released their debut studio album, The Kids Are Alright, on March 23, 2018, to critical acclaim. Promoting the album, Chloe x Halle performed "Happy Without Me" and "The Kids Are Alright" on Jimmy Kimmel Live!.

Chloe x Halle's performance at Coachella Valley Music and Arts Festival was well received by critics. On May 31, 2018, it was announced that they would be the opening act for the U.S. leg of Beyonce and Jay-Z's On the Run II Tour, alongside DJ Khaled. Chloe x Halle were nominated for two Grammy Awards in December 2018 -- Best New Artist and Best Urban Contemporary Album (for The Kids Are Alright). At the ceremony, they honored American musician Donny Hathaway by performing his 1972 single "Where Is the Love", and they presented the award for Best Rap Album to Cardi B. Chloe x Halle's performance of "America the Beautiful" at the Super Bowl LIII was praised by their mentor Beyoncé and by several news publications.

In July 2019, Disney announced that Halle Bailey had been cast as Princess Ariel in the upcoming live-action remake of The Little Mermaid, set to be directed by Rob Marshall. She would also record and perform the soundtrack for the film. Halle Bailey's casting as Ariel caused controversy, with some claiming that casting an African American in the role of Ariel was unfaithful to the original character. An online petition, #NotMyAriel, was started, trying to get the role of Ariel recast. Disney responded to the public with an open letter defending their casting.

The duo appeared and performed on American media personality Nick Cannon's television show Wild 'n Out in late July 2019. In September 2019, their cover of The Platters's "Enchanted" was featured in the recap montage of Jesse Pinkman's arc on Breaking Bad to coincide the Netflix film El Camino: A Breaking Bad Movie.

2020–present: Ungodly Hour 

On April 17, 2020, Chloe x Halle and Swae Lee released "Catch Up", a collaboration with Mike Will Made It, alongside a lyric video, and on May 14, 2020, the duo released the single "Do It" and announced their second album, Ungodly Hour. The next day, "Forgive Me" was announced as the second single, released along with a video. They released Ungodly Hour on June 12, 2020, to critical acclaim. The album debuted at number 16 on the Billboard 200 chart with 24,000 units sold. "Do It" also became their first entry on the Billboard Hot 100, debuting at number 83, on the chart dated June 27, 2020. They performed the song at the 31st GLAAD Media Awards, as well as the 2020 BET Awards, which was where they also performed "Forgive Me" for the first time. Amid the COVID-19 pandemic, Chloe x Halle also performed "Do It" on the Dear Class of 2020 virtual commencement event in early June 2020, as well as on The Today Show, and Jimmy Kimmel Live!. On August 30, the duo performed the title track, "Ungodly Hour", during the pre-show for the 2020 MTV VMAs. Chloe x Halle performed the American national anthem at the kickoff game for the 2020 NFL season in September 2020. In early September 2020, Chloe x Halle released a remix of their single "Do It" featuring Doja Cat, City Girls and Mulatto. The duo hosted the Glamour Women of the Year Awards in October 2020.

In November 2020, they received nominations for Album of the Year, Song of the Year, Video of the Year, Best Dance Performance and The Ashford And Simpson Songwriter's Award at the 2020 Soul Train Music Awards. They also received nominations for Best Progressive R&B Album, Best R&B Song and Best Traditional R&B Performance at the forthcoming 63rd Annual Grammy Awards. On November 15, the duo performed the album's title track, "Ungodly Hour", at the 46th E! People's Choice Awards, where they were nominated for "Group of 2020". In December 2020, Chloe x Halle appeared in The Disney Holiday Singalong event and performed "Do You Want to Build a Snowman?". They shortly performed the songs "Don't Make It Harder on Me", "Baby Girl", "Do It", "Ungodly Hour" and "Wonder What She Thinks of Me" at their NPR Tiny Desk Concert in December 2020. They also performed "Baby Girl" at the 2020 Billboard Women in Music ceremony, where Beyoncé presented them with the Rising Star Award.

On February 24, 2021, a music video for the album's title track "Ungodly Hour" was released. Following this, Ungodly Hour (Chrome Edition), a reissue of the album, was released on February 26, 2021. The reissue would include two new songs and a first time vinyl release. On October 8, 2021, it was announced that Chloe x Halle would be among those honored at the 2021 Ebony Power 100 event on October 23 in Los Angeles. Chloe x Halle were named as stars on the rise in the NextGen bracket.

Artistry 
Chloe x Halle write and arrange all of their songs in their home studio. They are also self-taught musicians. Halle enjoys jazz and has been listening to Billie Holiday from a young age. She cited the singer as being one of the major influences on her vocals. Chloe, the primary producer, is inspired by artists such as Grimes, Missy Elliott, and Tune-Yards, as well as some R&B artists. The duo describe their style of music as "confetti" because of its "harmonious" nature put together with "heavy beats and 808 drums that come together like a symphony." Chloe x Halle have said that their music style is a combination of their music tastes. Chloe said: "My sister and I like to make music that has interesting sounds and nuances."

Discography

Studio albums
 The Kids Are Alright (2018)
 Ungodly Hour (2020)

Tours
Opening act
 Beyoncé – The Formation World Tour (2016)
 Andra Day – Cheers to the Fall Tour (2016)
 Jay-Z and Beyoncé – On the Run II Tour (2018)

Filmography

Film

Television

Music videos
All Night – (2016)
Drop – (2016)
 Fall – (2016)
 Grown – (2017)
 The Kids Are Alright – (2018)
 Warrior – (2018)
 Happy Without Me – (2018)
 Shine Bright – (2018)
 Cool People – (2018)
 Who Knew – (2019)
 Catch Up – (2020)
 Do It – (2020)
 Forgive Me – (2020)
 Ungodly Hour – (2021)

Awards and nominations

References

External links

 

 
1998 births
2000 births
Living people
African-American girl groups
American hip hop groups
African-American women singers
American musical duos
American pop girl groups
American contemporary R&B musical groups
American soul musical groups
Musical groups established in 2003
Musical groups from Georgia (U.S. state)
Musical groups from Atlanta
Indie pop groups from Georgia (U.S. state)
Contemporary R&B duos
Feminist musicians
Female musical duos
Sibling musical duos
American vocal groups
Parkwood Entertainment artists
African-American feminists
American feminists
Columbia Records artists
Sister duos